Zlaté Moravce (1776 Morawce) is a town in south-western Slovakia.

Basic data
It is the capital and the biggest town of Zlaté Moravce District. It is approximately 120 km from the Slovak capital Bratislava and 32 km from Nitra.

History

The town is situated on the banks of the river Žitava, in the northern part of the Podunajská Heights. Nowadays, it also includes the area of formerly separate boroughs Chyzerovce and Prílepy. Thanks to its favourable location on the natural terrace of the river Žitava, the traces of the continuous settlement of this area go back to the Paleolithic Age. The rich archeological findings in the town area also prove intensive Great Moravian settlement in the 9th-10th century. A unique finding – a golden pectoral cross – is associated with this settlement.

The origin of the oldest name of the borough "Morowa" in the Charter of Zobor of 1113 is related to that time as well. This charter is the oldest written proof of the existence of Moravce as Zobor Monastery's property. The borough that was situated on the important route to Tekov was already in the 13th century dominated by a small Roman church surrounded by a cemetery, which was located on the site of today's square.

The first written mentions of the town are from 12th century A.D. (1113 Morowa, 1284 Marouth). "Moravce" [pronounced app. Moravtseh], a word in plural, was a frequent settlement name in Slovakia and means "settlement of (the tribe) Moravians". The attribute "zlaté", meaning "golden", was added only later in order to distinguish the settlement's name from all the other "Moravce"s. Ottomans plundered the city in 1530 and 1573. Rivers (Žitava, Zlatnanka) in the surrounding areas were known in the past for gold washing. Note the name of the second river. Across Slavic languages, Zlato means gold.

In late 1700s, the town was purchased by Cristoph Cardinal Migazzi, who completed renovations of local chateau for purposes of his private summer residence.

Demographics
According to the 2001 census, the town had 15,618 inhabitants. 97.09% of inhabitants were Slovaks, 0.60% Czechs and 0.29% Hungarians. The religious makeup was 82.52% Roman Catholics, 10.59% people with no religious affiliation and 1.48% Lutherans. An active Jewish community had existed here until the Holocaust. Zlaté Moravce has a town status from 1960.

Industry
The town is known for the production of kitchen technologies (well known as a brand CALEX which is actually not existing in the present) and building materials - bricks.

Historical monuments 
WWI and WWII victims
Holocaust victims from Zlaté Moravce memorial

Notable people
Janko Kráľ, a poet of Slovak Romanticism
Ján Kocian, footballer, football trainer
Tono Stano, photographer

Twin towns — sister cities

Zlaté Moravce is twinned with:

 Bučovice, Czech Republic
 Hulín, Czech Republic
 Velké Přílepy, Czech Republic
 Našice, Croatia
 Sierpc, Poland  
 Szydłów, Poland

References

External links
 Homepage - The official website of Zlaté Moravce (in Slovak only)
 Map of Zlaté Moravce

Cities and towns in Slovakia